The Uriah Butler Highway, sometimes referred to as UBH, is one of the major north–south highways on Trinidad in Trinidad and Tobago.

It is named after Tubal Uriah Butler.

It runs from Champs Fleurs to Chaguanas where it meets the Sir Solomon Hochoy Highway.  It crosses the Churchill-Roosevelt Highway at Valsayn.

The highway was originally named the Princess Margaret Highway and was constructed in 1958.  It was extended and renamed for labour leader Tubal Uriah Butler in 1988.

Description 
The Uriah Butler Highway is generally considered the more important of the two north-south highways on Trinidad, as it carries both traffic from the Sir Solomon Hochoy Highway and traffic from areas north of Chaguanas. Because of this, it suffers from congestion on most weekdays.

Route 
The highway begins at Champs Fleurs, crossing the Priority Bus Route and Eastern Main Road successively. Further south and just before the Valsayn interchange, a roundabout provides access to Mount Hope. At Grand Bazaar, west of Valsayn, the highway crosses the east-west Churchill Roosevelt Highway, connected via a modern interchange with high speed ramps. It then continues past Bamboo Village, Caroni, Cunupia and Chaguanas, where it joins the Sir Solomon Hochoy Highway which runs south to Debe.

Features 
From Champs Fleurs to Grand Bazaar, the expressway has 2 lanes in either direction. From Grand Bazaar to the southern terminus at Chaguanas, the expressway is mostly a 6 lane dual carriageway, excluding a brief section of the southbound lane at Grand Bazaar having 4 lanes. The entire highway is grade separated from Grand Bazaar to Chaguanas. North of Grand Bazaar, one roundabout provides access to the Eric Williams Medical Sciences Complex, while the northern terminus is signalized. There are six pedestrian overpasses scattered from Guayamare to Endeavour.

Exit List
The following table lists the major junctions along the Uriah Butler Highway. The entire route is located in Trinidad.

References

 

Roads in Trinidad and Tobago
Trinidad (island)